Christina Jackbin Nanghali Van-Dunem Da Fonsech-Shikongo (born 1978) is a Namibian police officer. She holds the rank of chief inspector in the Namibian Police Force who is known as the "Nampol Iron Lady" for her role in establishing and revamping the community policing initiatives especially in the Khomas region. She is also known for cracking down fake pastors and unscrupulous traditional healers.

Private life 
Born Christina Jackbin Nanghali Fonsech in Oshakati, her father is an Angolan trader and her mother is Namibian. She changed her surname in 2015 to Van-Dunem Da Fonsech, and added the surname of her husband Elia Shikongo in 2020.

At an early age she felt abandoned and she never had an opportunity to be raised by her biological parents and she grew up without  knowing her biological mother.  She had been moving from one home to other that made her up bring a difficult. This led her to dropping out of school in grade nine and working as nanny. Due to her financial circumstances, she was among the children that the former president Sam Nujoma paid school fees for, in 1992.

Van-Dunem Da Fonsech-Shikongo has two children, born in 2003 and 2005.

Career 
Da Fonsech-Shikongo joined the Namibian police in 2003, a week after giving birth to her firstborn. After her police training she was stationed in Oshana region. In 2012, she was transferred to Windhoek, where she headed the regional community affairs office, holding the rank of chief inspector.

During the police leadership of the retired inspector general Sebastain Ndeitunga, Da Fonsech-Shikongo was known for arresting self proclaimed traditional doctors and prophets especially in informal settlements around  Windhoek.  With Da Fonsech-Shikongo  leading the team the police where able to find rescue some citizens who are kept  in those churches against they will. In 2018 they were able to rescue a young women who has been in hostage for three years after she left her job, sold her belonging and  came  to leave in the church. The police conduct these type of operations due to complains that community members rise against the traditional doctors and self proclaimed prophets.

References 

Namibian police officers
Living people
1978 births
Women police officers
People from Oshana Region